André Clarindo dos Santos (born 8 March 1983) is a Brazilian footballer who most recently played for Figueirense. Santos is a left-back, who can also be deployed as a left winger. On 15 June 2009, he made his first international appearance as a substitute in a match against Egypt. Santos participated and helped Brazil capture the 2009 FIFA Confederations Cup. He joined Arsenal from Fenerbahçe in August 2011.

Early life and career
André Santos spent his early career with Figueirense, Flamengo and Atlético Mineiro.

Corinthians
In 2008, Santos moved to Corinthians, with Figueirense retaining 50% economic rights for the future transfer fee. The deal was partially financed by DIS Esporte, to which Corinthians later sold 22.5% of the rights. along with Dentinho and Renato, for R$ 5.4 million total fee. Corinthians also sold 40% rights to Turbo Sports, for R$3.6 million and after that partnered with the investor to sign Figueirense's remain 50% rights, making Corinthians own 37.5% of the players' rights after the deal. However, Corinthians did not pay Turbo Sports for its portion of the transfer fee (from Fenerbahçe), after which the company sued Corinthians.

Fenerbahçe
On 20 July 2009, he joined Turkish club Fenerbahçe together with his teammate in Corinthians, Cristian Oliveira Baroni. They signed a 5-year contract.

He scored a total of 10 goals in 52 league appearances for the football club. He scored 5 goals in 25 appearances in the Turkish Super League in the 2010–11 season, making him the top scoring left back in Turkey. On 29 August 2011, Arsenal agreed a €7m fee for the transfer of Santos.

Santos later said that he was not deserting a sinking ship by leaving Fenerbahçe, insisting he loved playing for them.
"I am leaving Fenerbahçe from front door", Santos told reporters at Istanbul airport on 31 August. "I love the country, Istanbul and Turkish people. I can come back here at the latter stages of my career. I was happy at Fenerbahçe but I did right thing for my career.

Arsenal
On 31 August 2011, André Santos signed for Arsenal on a long-term contract, Fenerbahçe SK announced the fee was €7 million.

He made his debut for the Gunners on 13 September, coming on as an 86th-minute substitute for Gervinho in a 1-1 draw away to Borussia Dortmund in the UEFA Champions League.  On 28 September, he scored his first goal for Arsenal in the 2–1 win over Olympiacos in the UEFA Champions League.

Santos made his return on 24 March 2012 in a 3–0 win against Aston Villa coming on as a substitute for Kieran Gibbs in the 68th minute.

On 13 May, he scored the equalising goal against West Bromwich Albion, levelling the score at 2–2. Arsenal went on to win the match 3–2 thanks to a Laurent Koscielny winner.On 3 November, after a dismal first-half performance against Manchester United, Santos came under even more criticism after having swapped shirts with ex-Gunner captain Robin van Persie at half-time.

Grêmio

On 10 February 2013, Santos moved to Porto Alegre after signing a one-year loan deal (with the option for Arsenal to recall him after 6 months) with Grêmio. He was contracted with the club to play in the Libertadores.

Flamengo
Santos signed for Flamengo on a two-year contract on Thursday 18 July 2013, after his loan spell at Gremio came to an end.

On 20 July 2014, Santos was attacked by a Flamengo fan following his poor performance in their 4-0 loss against Internacional. The loss meant Flamengo had accumulated 7 points in 11 games and the incident left Santos in hospital.

On 15 August 2014, the fullback reached an agreement to leave the club, becoming a free agent.

FC Goa
On 29 September 2014, Santos joined Indian Super League side FC Goa. Santos had a very successful season with Goa, as he led them to the semi-finals. As Goa's key player, he scored 4 goals and provided 3 assists in the tournament.

Botafogo (SP)
On 5 February 2015 Santos joined Botafogo Futebol Clube (SP) and signed a contract till the end of the championship.

FC Wil
After joining Swiss side FC Wil 1900, Santos left the club after one season, he made 25 appearances and scored 9 goals in the Challenge League.

Boluspor
On 24 June 2016, Santos signed a two-year contract with Turkish club Boluspor.

International career
On 21 May 2009, he was called up for the first time to the Brazil national team for 2010 FIFA World Cup qualification and the 2009 FIFA Confederations Cup in South Africa. On 15 June 2009, he made his first international appearance as a substitute in a match against Egypt. He then started the following four games as Brazil went on to win the competition. He was in the starting line-up in the Final against United States but was substituted in the 66th minute of play for Dani Alves as he earlier picked a yellow card. Brazil went on to win the match 3–2. However, he was dropped for the friendlies afterwards and Dunga preferred Michel Bastos and Gilberto on the match against Republic of Ireland in February 2010. That 22-man squad against Ireland also became the backbone of 2010 FIFA World Cup squad announced on 11 May. After a disappointing World Cup for the national side, Dunga was replaced by Mano Menezes. Under Menezes, Santos regained his spot in the starting line-up.

Career statistics

Club

Honours

Club
Corinthians
Copa do Brasil: 2009

Flamengo
Copa do Brasil: 2013

Fenerbahçe
Turkish Süper Lig: 2010–11
Süper Kupa: 2009

International
Brazil
FIFA Confederations Cup: 2009

References

External links
 bbc.co.uk
 Arsenal Profile
 
 
 
 

1983 births
Living people
Brazilian footballers
Brazilian expatriate footballers
Campeonato Brasileiro Série A players
Sport Club Corinthians Paulista players
Figueirense FC players
CR Flamengo footballers
Clube Atlético Mineiro players
Fenerbahçe S.K. footballers
Arsenal F.C. players
Grêmio Foot-Ball Porto Alegrense players
FC Goa players
Botafogo Futebol Clube (SP) players
Boluspor footballers
Süper Lig players
TFF First League players
Premier League players
Indian Super League players
Swiss Challenge League players
Expatriate footballers in Turkey
Brazilian expatriate sportspeople in Turkey
Expatriate footballers in England
Brazilian expatriate sportspeople in England
Expatriate footballers in India
Expatriate footballers in Switzerland
2009 FIFA Confederations Cup players
2011 Copa América players
FIFA Confederations Cup-winning players
Brazil international footballers
Association football fullbacks
FC Wil players
Footballers from São Paulo